Landscape with Polyphemus (Paysage avec Polyphème) is a 1649 oil painting by French artist Nicolas Poussin.

Theme 
The painting refers to a Spanish literary work La Fábula de Polifemo y Galatea and Ovid's Metamorphoses. It was commissioned by French banker Jean Pointel and depicts characters from Greek mythology. In the foreground pictured are semi-nude nymphs watched by satyrs hidden in the nearby bushes. On green fields behind them people listen to music played on a flute by the Cyclops Polyphemus, who appears to be blended into rocky mountains in the background.

History 
In 1722 the painting was acquired for the Spanish king Philip V by Andrea Procaccini, a student of Carlo Maratta. Later, it was part of the collection of a French marquess who sold it in 1772 to a Russian prince, with the help of Denis Diderot, in order to pay a gambling debt. It is now located in Saint Petersburg as part of the Hermitage Museum's collection.

References 

1649 paintings
Landscape paintings
Mythological paintings by Nicolas Poussin
Paintings depicting Greek myths
Paintings in the collection of the Hermitage Museum
Paintings based on Metamorphoses